Robert Skene may refer to:

 Robert Skene (polo player) (1914–1997), Australian polo player
 Robert Skene (cricketer) (1908–1988), English cricketer
 Robert Skene (British Army officer) (1719–1787), British Army officer and politician